Renesmee can refer to:
Renesmee Carlie Cullen, a character in the novel Breaking Dawn by Stephenie Meyer.
Renesmee (name), the given name invented for the character.